Zor is a 1998 Indian Hindi-language action film produced by Vivek Kumar and directed by Sangeeth Sivan. It stars Sunny Deol, Sushmita Sen, Milind Gunaji and Om Puri. Released theatrically on 13 February 1998, it was a commercial failure.

Plot 
Zor is about innocent people being targeted by mafia and politicians to turn them into terrorists. Arjun (Sunny Deol), a photojournalist, is an only son of Police Commissioner (Anupam Kher) and happy with his Mother, younger sister and grandmother. He meets Aarti (Sushmita Sen), a low profile reporter in a small daily who wants to make a name as a famous reporter and both fall in love. Both decide to marry, but there is a problem.

Arjun tells Aarti that they need to wait for approval from his close friend Iqbal (Milind Gunaji), who is a former Army captain (Expert in explosives) before they could get married. Meanwhile, Arjun's father is blamed for letting off an unknown terrorist and declared as a traitor. Iqbal is also present at Arjun's home during Arjun's sister's engagement while police arrest the Commissioner. Arjun knows it is a conspiracy against his dad and sets off to find the vanished terrorist and catch the people behind the conspiracy to restore his father's dignity. Meanwhile, Iqbal leaves Arjun's home without any clue.

This makes Arjun suspicious about Iqbal and goes to Kashmir, he survived a terrorist attack there and found that Iqbal is the leader of the group which attacked him. Iqbal tells Arjun why he became a terrorist from a patriotic army captain. Iqbal had a family and wife whom he loved more than anything, however he lost them in a communal riot in his village and a communal leader Shah Alam (Om Puri) took him along hundreds of youths to prepare them to fight against the people who destroyed their village. Gradually, Iqbal is turned into anti-national and eventually a leader of a terrorist group.

Upon hearing Iqbal's story, Arjun explained to him that it is all a conspiracy to make Iqbal a terrorist as he was an expert in explosives serving in the Indian Army, and to utilise his skills to produce explosives to destroy his own country and his own people. Iqbal finally understands and accepts in offering help to Arjun.

After hearing that Iqbal has left him, Shah Alam informs his crime partner Swamiji. Swamiji goes to Ajay's home and threatens to finish his family if he does not keep quiet. Swami and Alam are also looking for Iqbal, to kill him, as he is going to be an evidence against them.

Finally, when the Commissioner is about to be pronounced a culprit, Arjun brings Iqbal to court after going through lot of bloodshed. Arjun clarifies to the judge that it's people like Swamiji and Alam who are the real traitors, who create terrorists out of innocent people like Iqbal. Iqbal gives all evidence against Alam and Swamiji, thus the court declares Iqbal and Commissioner as innocent and releases them. Alam is arrested, however, Swamiji refuses to give in, saying that his followers will create a ruckus if he is arrested, however, Arjun with help of his media friends have live telecast entire proceedings of the court on a national channel, hence revealing Swamiji's real nature to his followers. His own followers beat him to death. Arjun has accomplished his mission after restoring his Father's pride.

Cast 
Sunny Deol – Arjun U. Singh
Sushmita Sen – Aarti
Milind Gunaji – Iqbal Khan
Om Puri – Shah Alam
Mohan Agashe- Swami Satyanand
Govind Namdeo- Central Minister
Anupam Kher - Police Commissioner Uday Singh
Dina Pathak- Arjun Grandmother 
Laxmikant Berde
Veeru Krishnan
Tiku Talsania- Newspaper Editor

Soundtrack

All songs are composed by Agosh (Band) with lyrics by Anand Bakshi except three songs are "Kya Tum Ne Hai Kah Diya", "Naina Bole Naina" and "Chup Tum Raho".

References

External links
 

1990s Hindi-language films
1998 films
1998 action films
Films scored by Vidyasagar
Films directed by Sangeeth Sivan